Angelika Neuner (born 23 December 1969) is an Austrian luger who competed from 1987 to 2002. Competing in four Winter Olympics, she won two medals in the women's singles event with a silver in 1992 and a bronze in 1998. Her younger sister, Doris, won the gold medal in the same event at Albertville in 1992.

Neuner also won six medals at the FIL World Luge Championships, including two gold (Mixed team: 1996, 1997), one silver (Mixed team: 1993), and three bronzes (Women's singles: 1997, Mixed team: 1995, 2000).

She won five medals at the FIL European Luge Championships, earning them in 1992 (silver: Mixed team), 1996 (silver: Mixed team, bronze: Women's singles), 1998 (bronze: Mixed team) and 2002 (bronze: Mixed team).

Neuner's best finish in the overall Luge World Cup was second in 1996–7.

She carried the Austrian flag during the opening ceremonies of the 2002 Winter Olympics in Salt Lake City.

References
 1994 luge women's singles results
 2002 luge women's singles results
 FIL-Luge.org February 26, 2002 article on flag bearers during the opening ceremonies of the 2002 Winter Olympics in Salt Lake City, including Neuner.

External links
 

1969 births
Austrian female lugers
Living people
Lugers at the 1992 Winter Olympics
Lugers at the 1994 Winter Olympics
Lugers at the 1998 Winter Olympics
Lugers at the 2002 Winter Olympics
Olympic lugers of Austria
Olympic silver medalists for Austria
Olympic bronze medalists for Austria
Olympic medalists in luge
Medalists at the 1998 Winter Olympics
Medalists at the 1992 Winter Olympics
20th-century Austrian women
21st-century Austrian women